Terrence Duffin (born 20 March 1982) is a former Zimbabwean international cricketer, who played Test matches and One Day Internationals, captaining the side in ODIs.

International career
Duffin has played two Test matches for Zimbabwe against India as an opening batsman, scoring 56 in the first innings of that tour, making him the fifth Zimbabwean to score a half-century on Test debut. However, in the second innings, Duffin was dismissed for two by Zaheer Khan.

Duffin was selected as the captain of the Zimbabwean One Day International team to play Kenya without having played an ODI. He scored 53 runs in the first ODI and carried his team to victory. He was named man of the match for his match-winning contributions.

Domestic career
Duffin has also played 31 first class matches for Zimbabwe provinces Midlands, Matabeleland and the CFX Academy, as well as Zimbabwe A. In those matches, he has only got one century – 117 in a drawn Logan Cup game with Manicaland in 2004–05, but he has recorded twelve fifties in first-class cricket.

In the summer of 2004 he was the professional for Irvine Cricket Club, who play in Scotland's Western Union Division 1.

References

External links 
 

1982 births
Living people
Sportspeople from Kwekwe
White Zimbabwean sportspeople
CFX Academy cricketers
Midlands cricketers
Matabeleland cricketers
Zimbabwe Test cricketers
Alumni of Plumtree School
Zimbabwe One Day International cricketers
Zimbabwean ODI captains
Zimbabwean cricketers
Cricketers at the 2007 Cricket World Cup
Cricketers at the 2011 Cricket World Cup